= 1949 Ceasefire Line =

The 1949 Ceasefire Line can refer to:

- Green Line (Israel), the ceasefire lines drawn between Israel and its four neighbors in the 1949 Armistice Agreements
- Line of Control, a line drawn in 1972 to separate India and Pakistan in Kashmir that is almost identical to the line drawn in the 1949 Karachi Agreement
